Břežany I is a municipality and village in Kolín District in the Central Bohemian Region of the Czech Republic. It has about 300 inhabitants.

The Roman numeral in the name serves to distinguish it from the nearby municipality of the same name, Břežany II.

Administrative parts
The village of Chocenice is an administrative part of Břežany I.

References

Villages in Kolín District